During the 1998–99 Dutch football season, Feyenoord competed in the Eredivisie.

Season summary
Feyenoord won the Eredivisie with a comfortable 15-point margin over runners-up Willem II. This was their last Dutch league title until 2017.

First-team squad

Results

UEFA Cup

First round

Transfers

In
 Jon Dahl Tomasson - Newcastle United, July

References

Feyenoord
Feyenoord seasons
Dutch football championship-winning seasons